Make Believe is the third album by torch song singer Jessica Molaskey, accompanied by an all-star musical group that includes Bucky Pizzarelli and John Pizzarelli. Guest singer Adam Guettel joins her for a duet on Glad to Be Unhappy.

Track listing

Personnel
Jessica Molaskeyvocals
John Pizzarelliguitar, vocals
Bucky Pizzarelliguitar
Martin Pizzarellidouble-bass
Tony Tedescodrums
Adam Guettelguest, vocals (track 5)
Don Sebeskymusical arranger, orchestra
John Claytonmusic arrangement, orchestra

References

2004 albums
Jessica Molaskey albums